Mario Antonio Rodríguez Gaxiola aka Marito (born August 23, 1995 in Ahome, Sinaloa) is a professional Mexican footballer who currently plays for Cimarrones de Sonora Premier.

References

External links
 
 

Santos Laguna footballers
1995 births
Living people
Mexican footballers
People from Ahome Municipality
Association football midfielders
Guadalupe F.C. players